Isla Cardonosa Este, is an island in the Gulf of California east of the Baja California Peninsula. The island is uninhabited and is part of the Mexicali Municipality.

Biology

Isla Cardonosa Este has three species of reptile, including Aspidoscelis tigris (Tiger Whiptail), Phyllodactylus partidus (Isla Partida Norte Leaf-Toed Gecko), and Uta stansburiana (Common Side-blotched Lizard).

References

Islands of Mexicali Municipality
Islands of Baja California
Uninhabited islands of Mexico